The Cleveland Court School (also known as the Cleveland Court Elementary) is a historic school in Lakeland, Florida. It is located at 328 East Edgewood Drive. On July 22, 1999, it was added to the U.S. National Register of Historic Places.

References

External links

 Polk County listings at National Register of Historic Places
 Cleveland Court Elementary School at Florida's Office of Cultural and Historical Programs

Public elementary schools in Florida
Schools in Lakeland, Florida
National Register of Historic Places in Polk County, Florida